The Baseball and Softball Association of the Islamic Republic of Iran is the governing body for baseball and softball in Iran. It was founded in 1993 as a baseball, softball, cricket and rugby union federation, but split from the rugby and cricket federation in 2010. It is now an association inside Iran Federation of Sport Associations which is the governing body for minor sports in Iran.

There are 11 provincial teams that compete in two annual national championships. The first national championship is in August and the second in February. Tehran has won 9 out of the 12 championships while Kerman, Isfahan, and Booshehr have each finished first once.

Previous presidents 

Baseball, softball, cricket and rugby union federation era:

 Bahram Afsharzadeh (1993–2001)
 Mohamamd Bagher Zolfagharian (2001–2004)
 Abdollah Ramezanzadeh (2004–2006)
 Hossein Sadegh-Abedin (2006–2010)

Baseball and softball association era:

 Hamid Reza Asemi (2010–2013)
 Alireza Adib (2013-2017)
 Bahram Kardan (2017-2020)
 Houman Mansourian (2020-present)

See also
Iran national baseball team
Iran Baseball Championship
Iran Federation of Sport Associations

References

External links
  Official website
  Official website

Baseball federation
Federation
Ir
Sports organizations established in 1993